Anastasia Artyomovna Poluianova (born 10 July 2001) is a Russian retired pair skater. With her skating partner, Dmitry Sopot, she is the 2017 CS Tallinn Trophy bronze medalist and has won two medals on the ISU Junior Grand Prix series. She qualified for the 2015–16 JGP Final with her previous partner, Stepan Korotkov.

Career 
Poluianova began learning to skate in 2006. She trained as a single skater in Perm.

Partnership with Korotkov 
Poluianova and Stepan Korotkov began competing together in 2012. Coached by Valentina Tiukova and Pavel Sliusarenko at Perm Krai Sports Center in Perm, Poluianova/Korotkov made their international debut in late August 2015 at the Junior Grand Prix (JGP) competition in Riga. They were awarded the silver medal in Latvia and placed fourth at their second JGP assignment, in Linz, Austria. Their results qualified them for the 2015–16 JGP Final in Barcelona, where they finished sixth.

At Russian Nationals, Poluianova/Korotkov ranked tenth on the senior level and sixth at the junior event. They parted ways at the end of the season.

2016–2017 season: Partnership with Selkin 
Poluianova teamed up with Maksim Selkin in 2016. The two made their international debut in early September at the 2016–17 JGP event in Ostrava, Czech Republic, where they placed 4th.

At the 2017 Russian Championships, they placed 10th on the senior level and 11th at the junior event.

2017–2018 season: Partnership with Sopot 
Poluianova teamed up with Dmitry Sopot in 2017. They made their international debut at the 2017–18 JGP event in Minsk, Belarus where they placed 2nd behind teammates Daria Pavliuchenko / Denis Khodykin. They placed 3rd at their second JGP assignment, in Gdańsk, Poland. Their results qualified them for the 2017–18 JGP Final in Nagoya, Japan, where they placed 6th.

In November 2017 Poluianova/Sopot made their international senior debut at the 2017 CS Tallinn Trophy where they won the bronze medal.

At the 2018 Russian Championships, they placed 10th on the senior level and 8th at the junior event.

2018–2019 season 

Poluianova/Sopot started their season by competing in the 2018 JGP series. At their first JGP event of the season they won the silver medal in Linz, Austria. They were ranked 3rd in the short program and 2nd in the free skate and they were part of a Russian sweep of the pairs' podium. Poluianova/Sopot were more than 14 points behind the gold medalists, Polina Kostiukovich / Dmitrii Ialin but they beat the bronze medalists, Alina Pepeleva / Roman Pleshkov, by more than 7 points.

At their 2nd JGP event of the season they placed 4th in Ostrava, Czech Republic. With these results they qualified for the 2018–19 Junior Grand Prix Final where they finished 5th.

According to Tamara Moskvina, head coach of the Tamara Moskvina skating school where Anastasia and Dmitri trained, they have split up. He went on a cruise ship to skate in shows there. She apparently is not looking for a partner to continue her competitive career but plans to join the cruise ship once she is old enough.

Programs

With Sopot

With Selkin

With Korotkov

Competitive highlights 
JGP: Junior Grand Prix

With Sopot

With Selkin

With Korotkov

Detailed results 
With Sopot

References

External links 

 

2001 births
Russian female pair skaters
Living people
Sportspeople from Perm, Russia
Universiade silver medalists for Russia
Universiade medalists in figure skating
Competitors at the 2019 Winter Universiade